Elisabeth von Lahnstein (divorced Brandner and widowed Ryan) is a fictional character from the German soap opera Verbotene Liebe, portrayed by Martina Servatius. The character made her first appearance on 2 August 1999. After several guest appearances, Servatius became part of the main cast in March 2000. Elisabeth is considered to be the show's matriarch.

Creation and development
Originally planned as a short-term role, Elisabeth soon becomes the love interest for Arno Brandner. She is introduced as a strong businesswoman who takes over the cosmetic company Ryan Cosmetics after her husband's death. Elisabeth is also the mother of already established character Nina Ryan. She is a person in need of harmony and tries to solve other people's conflicts. Elisabeth marries Arno and becomes a central figure in his family. She raises Arno's nieces Jana and Nico. Another side of Elisabeth is shown when her marriage with Arno gets troubled and she starts an affair with the much younger Luke Esser. Arno and Elisabeth overcome their differences but their marriage is ruined when Elisabeth leaves him for Johannes von Lahnstein. As she becomes Johannes' wife, her life changes entirely. Elisabeth does always feel as much a part of the family as she did of Arno's before. After Johannes is presumed dead after his plane went down over the Atlantic ocean, Elisabeth has to fight for her place within the family and often has to face the vulgarness of her stepson Ansgar. She tries to honor her husband by trying to keep the family together. Later she marries Johannes' older brother Ludwig before losing him as well after he dies on a desert island. Because of the inner fighting in the family, her stepson Hagen forges his father's last will and names Elisabeth as new head of the family, which also makes her the CEO of Lahnstein Enterprises.

Relationships
Elisabeth is known through her marriages to the patriarchs of the show's major families. All of Elisabeth's husbands have died and only her marriage to Arno Brandner has been divorced several years before his ultimate death. In the spin-off miniseries Die längste Nacht von Königsbrunn, Elisabeth joked around that she has murdered all of her husbands and has a secret affair with the Lahnstein butler Justus. However, not much is known about her first husband from whom she inherited the cosmetic company Ryan Cosmetics and who is believed to be the father of her daughter Nina. Elisabeth's marriage with Arno is loving but challenged through Arno's stubbornness. The marriage becomes even more troubled when Elisabeth starts an affair with the much younger Luke Esser who hopes that she might leave Arno for him. Elisabeth eventually decides to stay with Arno and work on their problems. Over time the two start to grow apart and Elisabeth then leaves Arno for Johannes von Lahnstein. Johannes' children don't approve of Elisabeth at first. But over time all become to love her and see her as part of the family accept for Johannes' eldest son Ansgar. Her marriage to Johannes is short lived when he is presumed dead after his plane gets lost from the radar on a way to a business trip. After Johannes' death it becomes her priority to keep the family together. She later falls in love with Johannes' brother Ludwig but has a rival in Maria di Balbi. Ludwig decides to be with Elisabeth which causes Maria to have a nervous breakdown. She even goes as far as threatening to kill herself and Ludwig. Maria doesn't succeed and Ludwig and Elisabeth have a happy marriage for some time. After a boat accident Ludwig and his son Hagen are presumed dead. Hagen later returns and tells Elisabeth that Ludwig has died on a desert island in his arms. Elisabeth moves on with the young and attractive Ben Schöne. Over time she also becomes aware that butler Justus Stiehl has a crush on her on which both never act.

Storylines
Elisabeth comes to Düsseldorf to visit her daughter Nina. She starts to interfere in Nina's relationship with Erika Sander until Nina tells her to stop. Elisabeth is a hard working businesswoman who inherited the American cosmetic company Ryan Cosmetics from her late husband. After she starts visiting Düsseldorf on a regular basis, Elisabeth decides to relocate to be near to her daughter. She eventually starts to fall for constructor Arno Brandner (Konrad Krauss). After Elisabeth moves in with him, her niece Lara Cornelius (Karoline Schuch) comes to town after Elisabeth's sister Irene gets seriously ill. Lara moves in with Elisabeth and Arno. Irene eventually dies and Lara finds out that she is in fact Nina's daughter and therefore Elisabeth's granddaughter. Nina explains to her daughter that she was too young to take care of her and she and Elisabeth decided that it'd be better if Irene, who always wished for a child of her own, would take care of her. Lara is upset with Nina and Elisabeth but eventually forgives both of them and continues to live with Elisabeth and Arno. Elisabeth marries Arno and has to say goodbye to her daughter Nina who decides to start a new life in Greece. Lara wants to stay with Elisabeth but soon after Nina moved, Lara decides to join her mother.

Elisabeth and Arno's life becomes challenged when Arno's nieces Jana (Friederike Sipp) and Nico (Verena Zimmermann) show up. Arno's brother Achim is overwhelmed raising them after his wife Vera has died. Jana and Nico have to fear that they are taken by child protective services and separated when moved to foster care. Elisabeth and Arno decide to take the girls in, who are then joined by their older brother Robin. The life of Elisabeth changes dramatically with the three siblings in the Brandner household. While she becomes close with Jana and Robin, Nico rebels against Arno and Elisabeth and thinks that Achim will take back home very soon. Achim eventually shows up in Düsseldorf and reunites with his children. But he still does not feel ready to raise them and leaves the three in Arno and Elisabeth's care. Nico then grows to love Arno and Elisabeth and begins to have a special bond with the two of them. Elisabeth befriends Isabell Mohr, girlfriend of Arno's son Florian (Alex Huber). Isabell was raped and ends up pregnant. Elisabeth comforts her in this difficult time and agrees to Isabell's request to keep the rape a secret. Arno feels betrayed by Elisabeth when the truth comes out. He questions Elisabeth's loyalty and the two start to grow apart. Elisabeth decides to move out and finds comfort in the arms of a much younger Luke Esser. She becomes involved with him but Arno soon discovers that Luke is a con-artist. Luke tries to make Elisabeth and Arno's separation permanent and wants her to invest in a real estate project. Arno proves that Luke is a fraud and wins Elisabeth back.

In the meanwhile Ryan Cosmetics has become a division of Beyenbach AllMedia. After Martin von Beyenbach dies in an explosion, Sylvia Jones (Heike Brentano) sells the company to the Lahnstein Holding. Elisabeth has to fear for her company's future as Ansgar von Lahnstein (Wolfram Grandezka) isn't too keen about keeping Ryan Cosmetics alive. The company's profits diminished over the last few years. Ansgar decides to sell Ryan Cosmetics. Nico has found out that she's the daughter of Ansgar's father Johannes von Lahnstein (Thomas Gumpert) and tries to save Elisabeth's company. But Johannes agrees with Ansgar on his plan to sell and Elisabeth loses her company. After a state of shock, Elisabeth becomes a partner in Arno's construction company Brandner Bau. She plans on having more time for the family, visits her daughter and granddaughter in Greece and takes care of Isabell's newborn daughter Carolin. After a while Elisabeth disagrees with some of Arno's business decisions and decides to leave Brandner Bau.

Johannes offers Elisabeth a position as his personal assistant in his new-founded company JCL Investment. He had to start a new business after Ansgar crossed him and pushed him out of the Lahnstein Holding. Elisabeth becomes an important part of Johannes' new business. She has to take extra hours which soon starts to hurt her marriage to Arno. The couple distances themselves from one another and Elisabeth starts to fall for Johannes while Arno kisses a young Coco Faber. Arno regrets the kiss and tries to put more time in his marriage again. But Elisabeth work hours make it impossible for the couple to spend much time together. Elisabeth and Johannes grow closer and they kiss. Nico witnesses the kiss and wants Elisabeth to end whatever is going on with the two of them. Elisabeth tries to distance herself from Johannes but she ultimately doesn't succeed. She even gives up her job but returns after she cannot come up with a reason for quitting to Arno. Elisabeth and Johannes kiss again and sleep with each other when Arno walks in on them. For a short time Arno thinks he has no reason to live but is taking care of by his daughter Susanne. Elisabeth moves out of the Brandner home and receives a slap across the face from Susanne.

Elisabeth moves to Königsbrunn Castle where she gets a frosty welcome from Johannes' children. The affair also starts a feud between the Brandner family and the Lahnsteins. Arno starts to think the worst of any member of Johannes' family and is even vicious against Susanne's civil partner and Johannes' daughter Carla (Claudia Hiersche). In the meantime, Nico is upset with Johannes and Elisabeth because of them hurting Arno. Johannes' son Leonard (Lars Korten) becomes the first one to accept the relationship between Johannes and Elisabeth. Carla and Nico eventually accept the relationship as well but are still shocked when the two eventually get married. Ansgar believes that Elisabeth is only after the family's fortune and even tries to buy her off. Elisabeth and Johannes' time as a married couple is short lived. Johannes is on a way to a business trip when his plane gets lost from the radar over the Atlantic ocean. Elisabeth wants to believe that Johannes is still alive but eventually has to face reality and declares Johannes for dead. Shortly after Johannes' presumed death, Jana dies after a troubled marriage to Leonard. Arno and Nico blame Leonard for Jana's death even though Nico eventually apologizes to Leonard. After Johannes' death Elisabeth tries to keep the family together. Ansgar wants to get rid of his stepmother several times. The relationship between Elisabeth and Ansgar becomes so problematic that the two start to use the formal form to address each other.

After it becomes known that Johannes' will was forged, Carla becomes her father's successor. Elisabeth supports her stepdaughter against Ansgar and the two start running the Lahnstein Holding together. Besides Ansgar, Carla and Elisabeth have to look out for Adrian Degenhardt (Klaus Zmorek) who is out to destroy the family. Adrian even kidnaps Carla's daughter Sophia to blackmail money out of the Lahnsteins. He later tries to make up for it by helping Carla and Elisabeth against Ansgar before leaving town. As a shock to the family, Johannes' first wife Francesca turns up alive. Elisabeth loses her title and her marriage to Johannes becomes invalid. However it is soon revealed that Francesca is really her younger sister Maria di Balbi (Simone Ritscher) who has become part of one of Ansgar's schemes. Carla's cousin Sebastian (Joscha Kiefer) finds out that his father Ludwig (Krystian Martinek) might be still alive. Sebastian and his sister Helena discover him and he returns to Königsbrunn Castle after years of absence. Carla decides to start a new life with girlfriend Stella Mann and gives Ludwig back his right as the heir to the Lahnstein fortune. Ludwig and Elisabeth start to work closely together. However Maria tries to make Ludwig fall in love with her. She fails and Ludwig instead falls in love with Elisabeth.

Ludwig and Elisabeth want to marry but Maria does not want to give up. She lures him into a trap and then threatens to kill them both. Ludwig can be rescued and marries Elisabeth. The couple starts happily into their marriage but Elisabeth gets jealous when it is revealed that Ludwig once had a fling with her best friend Charlie Schneider (Gabriele Metzger) when the two of them were young. Elisabeth fears that Ludwig and Charlie still have too much in common. But she eventually moves past this. As Clarissa von Anstetten (Isa Jank) returns to Düsseldorf, she becomes another threat to Elisabeth's marriage. Clarissa wants to seduce Ludwig to get her company, Ligne Clarisse Lahnstein, back which now is a division of the new-founded Lahnstein Enterprises, the successor of the Lahnstein Holding. It takes Ludwig some time but he eventually sees through Clarissa and apologizes to Elisabeth for thinking she was paranoid where Clarissa is concerned. Ludwig takes a boat trip with his son Hagen and the two go missing. Elisabeth and Hagen's wife Dana Wolf try to hold on to the hope that Hagen and Ludwig could still be alive but Elisabeth eventually makes peace with the sad reality that Ludwig most likely died.

After Ludwig is officially declared dead another power struggle within the family occurs. Ansgar and Sebastian fight over the company while Elisabeth again tries to keep the family together. She has a short fling with a young Ben Schöne before starting a dessous line for older women with Charlie. After a year since Ludwig and Hagen went missing, Hagen reappears and has to tell Elisabeth that Ludwig in fact died on a desert island in his arms. Hagen returns with a new will which sees him as the head of the family. Sebastian and Ansgar start scheming against him. Soon Hagen has to leave again for the health of his son Max. The family has to vote for a new head. But the election turns out to be problematic with all three candidates - Sebastian, Ansgar and Rebecca (Jasmin Lord) - have the same number of votes. Hagen wants to end the fight in the family and forges a second will of Ludwig which Hagen writes with his father's blood. Elisabeth becomes the head of the family - and CEO of Lahnstein Enterprises - after Hagen wrote down that he can choose a successor if necessary. All family members are shocked that Elisabeth is at the top now even though Rebecca eventually congratulates her.

References

Notes
1.  The character's official title is Countess of Lahnstein through her marriages to Johannes and Ludwig von Lahnstein. From 2001 to 2007 and for a short time in 2009, Elisabeth's legal name was Elisabeth Brandner. She had to give up her title as Countess of Lahnstein for a short time in 2009 when Maria di Balbi claims to be the late Francesca von Lahnstein. The character was introduced as Elisabeth Ryan (1999-2001).

Verbotene Liebe characters
Television characters introduced in 1999
Fictional counts and countesses
Fictional business executives
Fictional socialites